Kushenin is a pterocarpan, a type of furano-isoflavonoid, found in Sophora flavescens.

References 

Pterocarpans
Methoxy compounds